Baseball was a sport at the inaugural Central American Games in 1926 and it has remained part of the event's sporting programme throughout its history. Cuba has dominated the tournament since its inception.

Results

Medal table

See also
Baseball awards#Americas
America Baseball Cup
Baseball at the Pan American Games
Baseball at the South American Games

References

 
Central American and Caribbean Games